Alan George Bamford CBE,  (12 July 1930 – 18 June 2011) was a British academic. From 1985 to 1991, he was Principal of Homerton College, Cambridge.

Bamford was educated at Prescot Grammar School and Borough Road College, London. He was a teacher in Lancashire from 1952 to 1962. Bamford was a Lecturer in Primary Education at the University of Liverpool from 1962 to 1963; Senior Lecturer in Education at Chester College from 1963 to 1966; Principal Lecturer in Education at St Katharine’s College, Liverpool from 1966 to 1971; Principal of Westhill Coll., Birmingham from 1971 to 1985.

References

1930 births
2011 deaths
Commanders of the Order of the British Empire
Principals of Homerton College, Cambridge
People educated at Prescot Grammar School
Academics of the University of Liverpool
Academics of the University of Chester
Academics of Liverpool Hope University